The International Campaign to Save the Monuments of Nubia was the relocation of 22 monuments in Lower Nubia, in Southern Egypt and northern Sudan, between 1960 and 1980. The success of the project, in particular the creation of a coalition of 50 countries behind the project, led to the creation of the World Heritage Convention in 1972, and thus to the modern system of World Heritage Sites.

The project began as a result of the building of the Aswan Dam, at the Nile's first cataract (shallow rapids), a location which defined the traditional boundary of Ancient Egypt and Nubia. The building of the dam was to result in the creation of Lake Nasser, which would submerge the banks of the Nile along its entire 479 km (298 mi) length south of the dam – flooding the entire area of historical Lower Nubia. Vittorino Veronese, director general of UNESCO described it in 1960: "It is not easy to choose between a heritage of the past and the present well-being of a people, living in need in the shadow of one of history’s most splendid legacies, it is not easy to choose between temples and crops."

It was described in the UNESCO Courier as "the greatest archaeological rescue operation of all time".

In April 1979, the monuments were inscribed on the World Heritage List as the Nubian Monuments from Abu Simbel to Philae, as one of the second group of properties added to the list (the first 12 had been added in 1978).

Overview
In 1959, an international donations campaign was launched by Egypt and Sudan to save the monuments of Lower Nubia: the southernmost relics of the Ancient Egyptian civilization were under threat from the impending creation of Lake Nasser, that was about to result from the construction of the Aswan High Dam.

The number of relocated monuments have been stated as 22 or 24 depending on how an individual site is defined. Only one archaeological site in Lower Nubia, Qasr Ibrim, remains in its original location and above water; previously a cliff-top settlement, it was transformed into an island. The relocated sites can be grouped as follows:
 Two temple groups moved nearby to nearly identical sites
 Eleven temples rebuilt and grouped in three oases overlooking Lake Nasser
 Seven temples placed in two museums
 Five sent to Western museums as "grants-in-return" for technical and financial assistance

The list of relocated monuments is as follows:

Historical images, monuments in situ

Description and contributions

Abu Simbel

One scheme to save the Abu Simbel temples was based on an idea by William MacQuitty to build a clear freshwater dam around the temples, with the water inside kept at the same height as the Nile. There were to be underwater viewing chambers. In 1962 the idea was made into a proposal by architects Jane Drew and Maxwell Fry and civil engineer Ove Arup. They considered that raising the temples ignored the effect of erosion of the sandstone by desert winds. However, the proposal, though acknowledged to be extremely elegant, was rejected.

The salvage of the Abu Simbel temples began in 1964 by a multinational team of archeologists, engineers and skilled heavy equipment operators working together under the UNESCO banner; it cost some US$40 million at the time (equal to $300 million in 2017 dollars). Between 1964 and 1968, the entire site was carefully cut into large blocks (up to 30 tons, averaging 20 tons), dismantled, lifted and reassembled in a new location 65 metres higher and 200 metres back from the river, in one of the greatest challenges of archaeological engineering in history. Some structures were even saved from under the waters of Lake Nasser.

Philae

In 1902, the Aswan Low Dam was completed on the Nile River by the British.  This threatened to submerge many ancient landmarks, including the temple complex of Philae.  The height of the dam was raised twice, from 1907 to 1912 and from 1929 to 1934, and the island of Philae was nearly always flooded.  In fact, the only times that the complex was not underwater was when the dam's sluices were open from July to October. During this period it was proposed that the temples be relocated, piece by piece, to nearby islands, such as Bigeh or Elephantine.  However, the temples' foundations and other architectural supporting structures were strengthened instead. Although the buildings were physically secure, the island's attractive vegetation and the colors of the temples' reliefs were washed away.  Also, the bricks of the Philae temples soon became encrusted with silt and other debris carried by the Nile. With each inundation the situation worsened and in the 1960s the island was submerged up to a third of the buildings all year round.

Any water that seeped through was pumped away. Next the monuments were cleaned and measured, by using photogrammetry, a method that enables the exact reconstruction of the original size of the building blocks that were used by the ancients. Foundations of the Philae monuments were ready on Agilkia by April 1977, and the transfer itself took place between 1977 and 1980.

Individual Egyptian campaigns
In addition to participating directly in the high profile salvage operations of Abu Simbel and Philae, the Egyptian Antiquities Organization carried out the rescue of many smaller temples and monuments alone using their own financial and technical means. As early as 1960 Egypt had started to rescue the temples of Taffa, Debod and Qertassi, followed by Dakka and Maharraqa in 1961 and Dendur in 1962. The temples of Wadi es-Sebua and Beit el Wali and the rock tomb of Pennut at Aniba were moved in 1964 with the support of a US grant, whilst the subsequent re-erection was carried out with Egyptian resources. The Temple of Derr was rescued in 1965, and the temples of Gerf Husein, the chapel of Abu Oda (cut out of rock), the chapels of Qasr Ibrim (the rest of which has remained in situ), and many rock inscriptions and drawings, were also saved.

West German operation at Kalabsha
Early in the campaign, the West German authorities offered to dismantle and re-erect the Temple of Kalabsha, the largest temple in all of Lower Nubia, with costs paid by West Germany. Germany's interest in making a significant contribution stemmed from its Egyptological heritage, including Lepsius' milestone work Denkmäler aus Ägypten und Äthiopien, as more specifically the work of Franz Christian Gau who had documented Kalabsha as early as 1819.

French operation at Amada
In addition to the work of French archaeologists at Abu Simbel, the French government provided significant technical and financial support for the removal of the Temple of Amada. Amada was considered "one of the most distinctive and best preserved examples of the art of the 18th dynasty."

Wider archaeological campaign
Given the impending flooding of a wide area, Egypt and Sudan encouraged archaeological teams from across the world to carry out work as broadly as possible. Approximately 40 teams from across the world came to the region, to explore an area of approximately 500 km in length.

In addition to the relocation operations, many countries participated in excavation and preservation work. Some of this work took place at the CEDAE (Centre d'Étude et de Documentation sur l'Ancienne Égypte, in English the Documentation and Study Centre for the History of the Art and Civilization of Ancient Egypt), founded in Cairo in 1955 to coordinate the academic efforts:

 Egypt: Five campaigns by the University of Cairo at Aniba. One campaign by the University of Alexandria at Gebel Adda. Eight excavation campaigns by the Antiquities Service on various sites. Three campaigns by the Antiquities Service for cutting out rock drawings. Removal of eight monuments, work in two others, dismantling of the front part of the temple of Amada and financial contribution to the work for saving this temple and those of Wadi es-Sebua, Beit el-Wali and Aniba.
 Sudan: Since 1960, successive expeditions by the Antiquities Service, led by a Unesco expert, for a general survey of Sudanese Nubia; excavations at some of the most important sites.

 Argentina: Three archaeological campaigns in the Sudan by the National University of La Plata
 Austria: Six archaeological campaigns in Egypt by the University of Vienna, in Egypt. Sending of an epigraphist to the CEDAE.
 Belgium: Sending of three experts to the CEDAE. Photogrammetric and epigraphic records of five monuments in the Sudan. Contribution to the cost of transferring the temple of Semna, Sudan.
 Canada: One archaeological campaign in Egypt by the Royal Ontario Museum
 Czechoslovakia: Five expeditions in Egypt by the Institute of Classical Archaeology of Charles University
 Denmark, Finland, Norway, Sweden: Four campaigns in Sudan by a joint mission. Finland alone: General surveying to the south of Gemai (near Wadi Halfa in Sudan).
 France: Six campaigns in Egypt by the Institut Français d'Archéologie Orientale. Two campaigns in Egypt by the University of Strasbourg. Photogrammetric study. Sending of nine experts to the CEDAE. Removal and reconstruction of the Temple of Amada, together with Egypt. Seven campaigns in Sudan by the Commission Nationale des Fouilles". Payment of the costs involved in transferring the temple of Aksha, Sudan
 West Germany: Three campaigns by the German Archaeological Institute
 East Germany: Expeditions by the German National Academy of Sciences Leopoldina to record the rock inscriptions and drawings and the ground-plan of the ruins of Attiri, Sudan.
 Ghana: Three campaigns in the Sudan by the University of Ghana
 Hungary: One campaign in Egypt by Museum of Fine Arts (Budapest)
 India: One campaign in Egypt by the Archaeological Survey of India
 Italy: Six campaigns in Egypt by the University of Milan, as well as the sending of three experts to the CEDAE. One campaign in Egypt by the Sapienza University of Rome. Three campaigns in Egypt by Museo Egizio (Turin), including financial contribution from city and museum for cutting out of the chapel of the Temple of Ellesyia. Experimental work with sounding methods by the Fondazione Lerici. 
 Netherlands: Two campaigns by Leyden Museum, in Egypt. Preliminary studies for saving the Island of Philae. Contribution to the cost of saving the temple of Kumna (Sudan).
 Poland: One campaign in Egypt and four in Sudan by the Polish Centre of Mediterranean Archaeology University of Warsaw. Sending of four architects to the CEDAE. 
 Spain: Four excavation campaigns and four campaigns to record and cut out rock inscriptions, in Egypt. Three excavation campaigns, in the Sudan.
 Switzerland: Two excavation campaigns in Egypt by the Schweizerisches Institut für Ägyptische Bauforschung und Altertumskunde in Kairo, one in co-operation with the University of Chicago, and one in co-operation with the Institut Français d'Archéologie Orientale. Architectural records of a temple and leadership of the Antiquities service expedition to cut out rock inscriptions in 1964. Sending of an expert to the CEDAE by the Swiss National Science Foundation.
 United Kingdom: Four campaigns in Egypt and two in Sudan by the Egypt Exploration Society. Two campaigns by the Egypt Exploration Society and the University of London for the general survey of Nubia. Sending of two experts to the CEDAE. Sending of an epigraphist (in co-operation with Brown University). Contribution to the dismantling of the temple of Buhen.
 United States: In Egypt: Four campaigns by the University of Chicago in Egypt, including one in co-operation with the Swiss Institute of Architectural Research. Complete surveying and recording of a temple by the University of Chicago. Four campaigns by Yale and Pennsylvania Universities. Pre-history research on the Abu Simbel site by Columbia University. Four campaigns by Yale University. Sending of an epigraphist by Brown University (Provi-dence) in collaboration with the Egypt Exploration Society. Four campaigns by the Museum of New Mexico (pre-history survey). Four campaigns by the American Research Centre. Contribution by the United States Government for saving the temples of Beit el- Wali, Wadi es-Sebua and Aniba. In Sudan: Three excavation campaigns by the University of Chicago. One pre-history survey campaign by Columbia University. Three pre-history survey campaigns by the Museum of New Mexico. Two excavation campaigns and one architectural survey campaign by the University of California. Sending of an epigraphist by Brown University (Providence). Three pre-history investigation campaigns by the University of Colorado Museum. Contribution by the United States Government for the transfer and re-erection of the temple of Buhen.
 Soviet Union: One survey and excavation campaign, in Egypt. General surveying and recording of rock inscriptions, in Egypt.
 Yugoslavia: Sending of two architects to the CEDAE. Removal of Christian wall paintings (two experts), in Egypt. Removal of Christian wall paintings (two experts), in the Sudan.

Financial contributions
The table below summarizes the contributions towards the project by the global coalition of nations. The vast majority of these contributions funded the operations at Abu Simbel and Philae.

Timeline
A timeline of the key dates of the campaign is shown below:

World Heritage Site
In April 1979, the monuments were inscribed on the World Heritage List as the "Nubian Monuments from Abu Simbel to Philae". The inscribed area includes ten sites, five of which were relocated (all south of the city of Aswan), and five of which remain in their original position (near to the city of Aswan):

Relocated sites, south of the Aswan Low Dam
 Abu Simbel
 New Amada
 New Wadi Sebua
 New Kalabsha
 Philae temple complex (Agilkia Island)

Sites in their original location, north of the Aswan Low Dam – although these five sites are grouped within the "Nubian Monuments from Abu Simbel to Philae", they are neither Nubian, nor between Abu Simbel and Philae
 Qubbet el-Hawa (Old and Middle Kingdom Tombs)
 Ruins of town of Elephantine
 Stone quarries and Unfinished obelisk, Aswan
 Monastery of St. Simeon, Aswan
 Fatimid Cemetery of Aswan

Gallery

Bibliography

UNESCO publications
 A Common trust: the preservation of the ancient monuments of Nubia, 1960, UNESCO CUA.60/D.22/A
 Save the treasures of Nubia: UNESCO launches a world appeal, 1960, UNESCO Courier
 Abu Simbel: now or never, 1961, UNESCO Courier
 Nubia's sands reveal their last secrets, 1964, UNESCO Courier
 Victory in Nubia: the greatest archaeological rescue operation of all time, 1980, UNESCO Courier
 
 Success stories, 2019, UNESCO

Other publications
 
 
 
  See also:

References

External links
 
 
 

1960 establishments in Egypt
1960 establishments in Sudan
Projects established in 1960
1980 disestablishments in Egypt
1980 disestablishments in Sudan
Projects disestablished in 1980
World Heritage Sites
Ancient Egypt
Relocated ancient Egyptian monuments
International Campaign to Save the Monuments of Nubia